The women's 500 metres in speed skating at the 1976 Winter Olympics took place on 6 February, at the Eisschnellaufbahn.

Records
Prior to this competition, the existing world and Olympic records were as follows:

The following new World and Olympic records was set during the competition:

Results

References

Women's speed skating at the 1976 Winter Olympics
Olymp
Skat